The 2014–15 Utah State Aggies men's basketball team represented Utah State University in the 2014–15 NCAA Division I men's basketball season. This was head coach Stew Morrill's 17th and final season at Utah State. The Aggies played their home games at the Dee Glen Smith Spectrum and were a member of the Mountain West Conference. They finished the season 18–13, 11–7 in Mountain West play to finish in a tie for fourth place. They lost in the quarterfinals of the Mountain West tournament to Wyoming.

On January 9, Stew Morrill announced his intention to retire at the end of the season. He finished his 17-year career at Utah State with a record of 402–156.

Previous season
The 2013–14 Utah State finished the season with an overall record of 18–14, 7–11 in Mountain West play to finish in a tie for eighth place. They lost in the quarterfinals of the Mountain West Conference tournament to San Diego State.

Departures

Incoming Transfers

Recruiting

Roster

Schedule

|-
!colspan=9 style="background:#003366; color:#FFFFFF;"| Exhibition

|-
!colspan=9 style="background:#002654; color:white;"| Regular season

|-
!colspan=9 style="background:#003366; color:#FFFFFF;"| Mountain West tournament

See also
2014–15 Utah State Aggies women's basketball team

References 

Utah State Aggies
Utah State Aggies men's basketball seasons
Aggies
Aggies